In Search of Peace is a 2017 Iranian TV series Drama directed by Saeed Soltani.

The series has been made in 44 episodes.

The series Dar Jostejoye Aramesh has been broadcast on the IRIB TV5 national television in Iran.

cinematography Group
Nasser Beikzadeh

Seyed Meysam Hosseini

Ramtin Forutani

Plot
Dr. Behrouz Amini is a Ph.D. scientist and research scientist in Iran. He has an exemplary family and succeeded in his career, and after 20 years of continuous effort, he has been able to produce a cancer-free drug that is not alike in the direction of national production and knowledge. After the production of medicine, the medical community sets up a celebration for Behrouz Amini, and his name and his company will be recited throughout the world of medical medicine, but one incident will put Dr. Amini's equations in disrepute and put his jealousy at risk.

Cast

 Mehdi Hashemi
 Pejman Bazeghi 
 Dariush Farhang
 Hadis Mir-Amini
 Mani Heidari
 Kamand Amirsoleimani
 Jamshid Mashayekhi
 Ata Omrani
 Zahra Saeedi
 Afsaneh Naseri
 Parviz Fallahipour
 Mahtab Servati

References

In Search of Peace in IRIB TV5 
In Search of Peace in Filcin
In Search of Peace in the Aparat

External links

2010s Iranian television series